Margaret McKay (née McCarthy; 22 January 1907 – 1 March 1996) was a British Labour Party Member of Parliament for Clapham from 1964 to 1970.

Early life 
Despite later assertions that McKay was born in 1911, she was in fact born on 22 January 1907 at Oswaldtwistle, Lancashire, a daughter of Joseph and Betsy Ann (Catlow) McCarthy.

Career 
McKay's family moved to New Bedford, Massachusetts in her youth, but then returned to England. McKay joined the Independent Labour Party's Guild of Youth, then the Young Communist League, graduating to the Communist Party of Great Britain.  She left the party in 1932, joining the Labour Party, and became active in the Socialist League, a left-wing pressure group within the party, serving as its general secretary from 1936 until it was dissolved the following year.  She also became general secretary of the National Union of Domestic Workers, a national organiser for the Transport and General Workers' Union, and Trades Union Congress Women's Officer (1951–1962).

After holding various trade union posts, McKay stood unsuccessfully for Labour in Walthamstow East at the 1959 general election. At the 1964 general election, she defeated the sitting Conservative MP Alan Glyn for Clapham, taking the seat with a majority of only 556. At the 1966 election she increased her majority to over 4,000 against the Conservative Ian Gow, but she stood down at the 1970 general election, when the seat was won by the  Conservative William Shelton.

While in Parliament, McKay became a supporter of Arab interests, creating a mock Palestinian refugee camp in Parliament Square and wearing Arab robes during debates. Jordan issued a postage stamp in her honour.  After retiring from politics, McKay moved to Abu Dhabi. She became a friend of the then President, Sheikh Zayed, and died there on 1 March 1996. She is buried at Sas Al Nakhl cemetery.

References

Further reading
Margaret McCarthy, Generation in Revolt, Heinemann, 1953

External links 
Obituary by Tam Dalyell (The Independent)
 

1907 births
1996 deaths
Communist Party of Great Britain members
Labour Party (UK) MPs for English constituencies
Female members of the Parliament of the United Kingdom for English constituencies
UK MPs 1964–1966
UK MPs 1966–1970
People from Oswaldtwistle
20th-century British women politicians
20th-century English women
20th-century English people